S. intermedia  may refer to:
 Siren intermedia, the lesser siren, an aquatic salamander species native to the eastern United States and northern Mexico
 Sorbus intermedia, the Swedish whitebeam, a tree species found in southern Sweden
 Splendrillia intermedia, a sea snail species
 Sporophila intermedia, the grey seedeater, a bird species found in Brazil, Colombia, Guyana, Trinidad and Tobago and Venezuela
 Stanhopea intermedia, an orchid species endemic to southwestern Mexico
 Stigmella intermedia, a moth species found in Ohio, Arkansas, Kentucky and Ontario
 Strauzia intermedia, a fruit fly species

Synonyms
 Scalaria intermedia, a synonym for Cirsotrema zelebori, a sea snail species
 Sclerotinia intermedia, a synonym for Sclerotinia minor, a plant pathogen species

See also
 Intermedia (disambiguation)